Pizza is a dish of  Italian origin consisting of a usually round, flat base of leavened wheat-based dough topped with tomatoes, cheese, and often various other ingredients (such as various types of sausage, anchovies, mushrooms, onions, olives, vegetables, meat, ham, etc.), which is then baked at a high temperature, traditionally in a wood-fired oven. A small pizza is sometimes called a pizzetta. A person who makes pizza is known as a pizzaiolo.

In Italy, pizza served in a restaurant is presented unsliced, and is eaten with the use of a knife and fork. In casual settings, however, it is cut into wedges to be eaten while held in the hand.

The term pizza was first recorded in the 10th century in a Latin manuscript from the Southern Italian town of Gaeta in Lazio, on the border with Campania. Modern pizza was invented in Naples, and the dish and its variants have since become popular in many countries. It has become one of the most popular foods in the world and a common fast food item in Europe, the Americas and Australasia; available at pizzerias (restaurants specializing in pizza),  restaurants offering Mediterranean cuisine, via pizza delivery, and as street food. Various food companies sell ready-baked pizzas, which may be frozen, in grocery stores, to be reheated in a home oven.

In 2017, the world pizza market was US$128 billion, and in the US it was $44 billion spread over 76,000 pizzerias.  Overall, 13% of the U.S. population aged 2 years and over consumed pizza on any given day.

The Associazione Verace Pizza Napoletana (lit. True Neapolitan Pizza Association) is a non-profit organization founded in 1984 with headquarters in Naples that aims to promote traditional Neapolitan pizza. In 2009, upon Italy's request, Neapolitan pizza was registered with the European Union as a Traditional Speciality Guaranteed dish, and in 2017 the art of its making was included on UNESCO's list of intangible cultural heritage.

Raffaele Esposito is often considered to be the father of modern pizza.

Etymology

The word "pizza" first appeared in a Latin text from the town of Gaeta, then still part of the Byzantine Empire, in 997 AD; the text states that a tenant of certain property is to give the bishop of Gaeta duodecim pizze ("twelve pizzas") every Christmas Day, and another twelve every Easter Sunday.

Suggested etymologies include:
 Byzantine Greek and Late Latin pitta > pizza, cf. Modern Greek pitta bread and the Apulia and Calabrian (then Byzantine Italy) pitta, a round flat bread baked in the oven at high temperature sometimes with toppings. The word pitta can in turn be traced to either Ancient Greek πικτή (pikte), "fermented pastry", which in Latin became "picta", or Ancient Greek πίσσα (pissa, Attic πίττα, pitta), "pitch", or πήτεα (pḗtea), "bran" (πητίτης pētítēs, "bran bread").
 The Etymological Dictionary of the Italian Language explains it as coming from dialectal pinza "clamp", as in modern Italian pinze "pliers, pincers, tongs, forceps". Their origin is from Latin pinsere "to pound, stamp".<ref>'pizza' , Online Etymology Dictionary"</ref>
 The Lombardic word bizzo or pizzo meaning "mouthful" (related to the English words "bit" and "bite"), which was brought to Italy in the middle of the 6th century AD by the invading Lombards. The shift b>p could be explained by the High German consonant shift, and it has been noted in this connection that in German the word Imbiss means "snack".

History

Foods similar to pizza have been made since the Neolithic Age. Records of people adding other ingredients to bread to make it more flavorful can be found throughout ancient history. In the 6th century BC, the Persian soldiers of the Achaemenid Empire during the rule of Darius the Great baked flatbreads with cheese and dates on top of their battle shields"The Science of Bakery Products" W. P. Edwards (2007), p.199 and the ancient Greeks supplemented their bread with oils, herbs, and cheese. An early reference to a pizza-like food occurs in the Aeneid, when Celaeno, queen of the Harpies, foretells that the Trojans would not find peace until they are forced by hunger to eat their tables (Book III). In Book VII, Aeneas and his men are served a meal that includes round cakes (like pita bread) topped with cooked vegetables. When they eat the bread, they realize that these are the "tables" prophesied by Celaeno.
The first mention of the word "pizza" comes from a notarial document written in Latin and dating to May 997 AD from Gaeta, demanding a payment of "twelve pizzas, a pork shoulder, and a pork kidney on Christmas Day, and 12 pizzas and a couple of chickens on Easter Day."

Modern pizza evolved from similar flatbread dishes in Naples, Italy, in the 18th or early 19th century. Before that time, flatbread was often topped with ingredients such as garlic, salt, lard, and cheese. It is uncertain when tomatoes were first added and there are many conflicting claims. Until about 1830, pizza was sold from open-air stands and out of pizza bakeries.

A popular contemporary legend holds that the archetypal pizza, pizza Margherita, was invented in 1889, when the Royal Palace of Capodimonte commissioned the Neapolitan pizzaiolo (pizza maker) Raffaele Esposito to create a pizza in honor of the visiting Queen Margherita. Of the three different pizzas he created, the Queen strongly preferred a pizza swathed in the colors of the Italian flag — red (tomato), green (basil), and white (mozzarella). Supposedly, this kind of pizza was then named after the Queen, although later research cast doubt on this legend. An official letter of recognition from the Queen's "head of service" remains on display in Esposito's shop, now called the Pizzeria Brandi.

Pizza was taken to the United States by Italian immigrants in the late nineteenth century and first appeared in areas where they concentrated. The country's first pizzeria, Lombardi's, opened in New York City in 1905. Following World War II, veterans returning from the Italian Campaign, who were introduced to Italy's native cuisine, proved a ready market for pizza in particular.

Preparation
Pizza is sold fresh or frozen, and whole or in portion-size slices. Methods have been developed to overcome challenges such as preventing the sauce from combining with the dough, and producing a crust that can be frozen and reheated without becoming rigid. There are frozen pizzas with raw ingredients and self-rising crusts.

Another form of pizza is available from take and bake pizzerias. This pizza is assembled in the store, then sold unbaked to customers to bake in their own ovens. Some grocery stores sell fresh dough along with sauce and basic ingredients, to assemble at home before baking in an oven.

Baking
In restaurants, pizza can be baked in an oven with fire bricks above the heat source, an electric deck oven, a conveyor belt oven, or, in traditional style in a wood or coal-fired brick oven. The pizza is slid into the oven on a long paddle, called a peel, and baked directly on hot bricks, a screen (a round metal grate, typically aluminum), or whatever the oven surface is. Before use, a peel is typically  sprinkled with cornmeal to allow the pizza to easily slide on and off it. When made at home, a pizza can be baked on a pizza stone in a regular oven to reproduce some of the heating effect of a brick oven. Cooking directly on a metal surface results in too rapid heat transfer to the crust, burning it.  Some home chefs use a wood-fired pizza oven, usually installed outdoors. As in restaurants, these are often dome-shaped, as pizza ovens have been for centuries, in order to achieve even heat distribution. Another variation is grilled pizza, in which the pizza is baked directly on a barbecue grill. Greek pizza, like deep dish Chicago and Sicilian style pizza, is baked in a pan rather than directly on the bricks of the pizza oven.

Most restaurants use standard and purpose-built pizza preparation tables to assemble their pizzas.  Mass production of pizza by chains can be completely automated.

Crust

The bottom of the pizza, called the "crust", may vary widely according to style – thin as in a typical hand-tossed Neapolitan pizza or thick as in a deep-dish Chicago-style. It is traditionally plain, but may also be seasoned with garlic or herbs, or stuffed with cheese. The outer edge of the pizza is sometimes referred to as the cornicione. Some pizza dough contains sugar, to help its yeast rise and enhance browning of the crust.

Dipping sauce specifically for pizza was invented by American pizza chain Papa John's Pizza in 1984 and has since been adopted by some when eating pizza, especially the crust.

Cheese

Mozzarella cheese is commonly used on pizza, with the buffalo mozzarella produced in the surroundings of Naples. Other cheeses are also used, particularly Italian cheeses including provolone, pecorino romano, ricotta, and scamorza. Less expensive processed cheeses or cheese analogues have been developed for mass-market pizzas to produce desirable qualities like browning, melting, stretchiness, consistent fat and moisture content, and stable shelf life. This quest to create the ideal and economical pizza cheese has involved many studies and experiments analyzing the impact of vegetable oil, manufacturing and culture processes, denatured whey proteins, and other changes in manufacture.

Varieties and styles

A great number of pizza varieties exist, defined by the choice of toppings and sometimes also crust. There are also several styles of pizza, defined by their preparation method. The following lists feature only the notable ones.

 Varieties 

 Styles 

 By region of origin 

Italy
Authentic Neapolitan pizza (pizza napoletana) is made with San Marzano tomatoes, grown on the volcanic plains south of Mount Vesuvius, and either mozzarella di bufala Campana, made with milk from water buffalo raised in the marshlands of Campania and Lazio or Fior-di-latte. Buffalo mozzarella is protected with its own European protected designation of origin. Other traditional pizzas include pizza alla marinara, which is topped with marinara sauce and is supposedly the most ancient tomato-topped pizza, pizza capricciosa, which is prepared with mozzarella cheese, baked ham, mushroom, artichoke, and tomato, and pizza pugliese, prepared with tomato, mozzarella, and onions.

A popular variant of pizza in Italy is Sicilian pizza (locally called sfincione or sfinciuni), a thick-crust or deep-dish pizza originating during the 17th century in Sicily: it is essentially a focaccia that is typically topped with tomato sauce and other ingredients. Until the 1860s, sfincione was the type of pizza usually consumed in Sicily, especially in the Western portion of the island. Other variations of pizzas are also found in other regions of Italy, for example pizza al padellino or pizza al tegamino, a small-sized, thick-crust, deep-dish pizza typically served in Turin, Piedmont.

United States

The first pizzeria in the U.S. was opened in New York City's Little Italy in 1905.  Common toppings for pizza in the United States include anchovies, ground beef, chicken, ham, mushrooms, olives, onions, peppers, pepperoni, pineapple, salami, sausage, spinach, steak, and tomatoes. Distinct regional types developed in the 20th century, including Buffalo, California, Chicago, Detroit, Greek, New Haven, New York, and St. Louis styles. These regional variations include deep-dish, stuffed, pockets, turnovers, rolled, and pizza-on-a-stick, each with seemingly limitless combinations of sauce and toppings.

Thirteen percent of the United States population consumes pizza on any given day. Pizza chains such as Domino's Pizza, Pizza Hut, and Papa John's, pizzas from take and bake pizzerias, and chilled or frozen pizzas from supermarkets make pizza readily available nationwide.

 Argentina 
Argentina, and more specifically Buenos Aires, saw significant Italian immigration at the end of the 19th century. Immigrants from Naples and Genoa opened the first pizza bars, though over time Spanish residents came to own the majority of the pizza businesses.

Standard Argentine pizza has a thicker crust, called "media masa" (half dough) than traditional Italian style pizza and uses more cheese. In Argentina pizza slices are often served topped with fainá, a Genoese chickpea-flour pancake, and accompanied by moscato wine. The most popular variety of pizza is called "muzzarella" (mozzarella), similar to Neapolitan pizza (bread, tomato sauce and cheese) but made with a thicker "media masa" crust, triple cheese and tomato sauce, usually also with olives. It can be found in nearly every corner of the country; Buenos Aires is considered the city with the most pizza bars per person of the world. Other popular varieties include ham, tomato slices, red pepper and longaniza. Two Argentine-originated varieties of pizza with onion, are also very popular: fugazza with cheese, a regular pizza crust topped with cheese and onions, and fugazzetta, with the cheese between two pizza crusts, with onions on top.

Records
 according to Guinness World Records:
The world's largest pizza was prepared in Rome in December 2012, and measured . The pizza was named "Ottavia" in homage to the first Roman emperor Octavian Augustus, and was made with a gluten-free base.
Other previous records include that of Marquinetti (Tomelloso, Spain), where a 1141.5 m pizza was achieved, itself surpassing a previous record in Poland.
The world's most expensive commercially available pizza recognised by Guinness World Records costs US$2,700, and was sold at Industry Kitchen (USA) in New York, New York, USA, as of 24 April 2017. It is made of black squid ink dough, and topped with UK white Stilton cheese, French foie gras and truffles, Ossetra caviar from the Caspian Sea, Almas caviar, and 24K gold leaves.
More expensive pizzas have been reported, but are not recognised by Guinness World Records, such as the  "Pizza Royale 007" at Haggis restaurant in Glasgow, Scotland, which is topped with caviar, lobster, and 24-carat gold dust, and the  caviar pizza made by Nino's Bellissima pizzeria in New York City, New York.
A pizza made by the restaurateur Domenico Crolla that included toppings such as sunblush-tomato sauce, Scottish smoked salmon, medallions of venison, edible gold, lobster marinated in cognac, and champagne-soaked caviar. The pizza was auctioned for charity in 2007, raising .

Pizza and health

Some pizzas mass-produced by pizza chains have been criticized as having an unhealthy balance of ingredients. Pizza can be high in salt and fat, and is high in calories. The USDA reports an average sodium content of 5,101 mg per  pizza in fast food chains. There are concerns about undesirable health effects.

Similar dishes
 Calzone and stromboli are similar dishes that are often made of pizza dough folded (calzone) or rolled (stromboli) around a filling.
 Panzerotti are similar to calzones, but fried rather than baked.
 Piadina is a thin Italian flatbread, typically prepared in the Romagna historical region.
 Focaccia is a flat leavened oven-baked Italian bread, similar in style and texture to pizza; in some places, it is called pizza bianca ("white pizza").
 "Farinata" or "cecina". A Ligurian (farinata) and Tuscan (cecina) regional dish made from chickpea flour, water, salt, and olive oil. Also called socca in the Provence region of France. Often baked in a brick oven, and typically weighed and sold by the slice.
 Coca is a similar dish consumed mainly in Catalonia and neighbouring regions, but that has extended to other areas in Spain, and to Algeria. There are sweet and savoury versions.
 The Alsatian Flammekueche (Standard German: Flammkuchen, French: Tarte flambée) is a thin disc of dough covered in crème fraîche, onions, and bacon.
 Garlic fingers is an Atlantic Canadian dish, similar to a pizza in shape and size, and made with similar dough. It is garnished with melted butter, garlic, cheese, and sometimes bacon.
 The Anatolian Lahmacun (Arabic: laḥm bi'ajīn; Armenian: lahmajoun; also Turkish pizza or Armenian pizza) is a meat-topped dough round. The base is very thin, and the layer of meat often includes chopped vegetables.
 The Levantine Manakish (Arabic: ma'ujnāt) and Sfiha (Arabic: laḥm bi'ajīn; also Arab pizza) are dishes similar to pizza.
Panizza is half a stick of bread (often baguette), topped with the usual pizza ingredients, baked in an oven.
 The Macedonian Pastrmajlija is a bread pie made from dough and meat. It is usually oval-shaped with chopped meat on top of it.
 The Provençal Pissaladière'' is similar to an Italian pizza, with a slightly thicker crust and a topping of cooked onions, anchovies, and olives.
 Pizza bagel is a bagel with toppings similar to that of traditional pizzas.
 Pizza bread is an open-faced sandwich made of bread, tomato sauce, cheese, and various toppings. 
 Pizza sticks are baked with pizza dough and pizza ingredients. Bread dough may also be used in their preparation, and some versions are fried.
Pizza Rolls are a trade-marked commercial product.
Okonomiyaki, a Japanese dish cooked on a hotplate, is often referred to as "Japanese pizza".
"Zanzibar pizza" is a street food served in Stone Town, Zanzibar, Tanzania. It uses a dough much thinner than pizza dough, almost like filo dough, filled with minced beef, onions, and an egg, similar to Moroccan basṭīla.
 Zwiebelkuchen, a German onion tart, often baked with diced bacon and caraway seeds.

See also

 
 List of baked goods
 List of Italian dishes
 List of pizza chains
 List of pizza varieties by country
 
 
 
 
 
 
 
 
 
 Pizza strips – a tomato pie of Italian-American origin

References

Further reading
 
  Explanation of eight pizza styles: Maryland, Roman, "Gourmet" Wood-fired, Generic boxed, New York, Neapolitan, Chicago, and New Haven.
 
 * 
  208 pages.

External links
 
 

 
Cheese dishes
Convenience foods
Flatbread dishes
Food combinations
Italian cuisine
Italian inventions
Italian-American cuisine
Mediterranean cuisine
National dishes
Neapolitan cuisine
Popular culture
Snack foods
Types of food
World cuisine